The sorites paradox (sometimes known as the paradox of the heap) is a paradox that results from vague predicates. A typical formulation involves a heap of sand, from which grains are removed individually. With the assumption that removing a single grain does not cause a heap to become a non-heap, the paradox is to consider what happens when the process is repeated enough times that only one grain remains: is it still a heap? If not, when did it change from a heap to a non-heap?

The original formulation and variations

Paradox of the heap
The word sorites derives from the Greek word for 'heap'. The paradox is so named because of its original characterization, attributed to Eubulides of Miletus. The paradox is as follows: consider a heap of sand from which grains are removed individually. One might construct the argument, using premises, as follows:

 grains of sand is a heap of sand (Premise 1)
A heap of sand minus one grain is still a heap. (Premise 2)

Repeated applications of Premise 2 (each time starting with one fewer grain) eventually forces one to accept the conclusion that a heap may be composed of just one grain of sand.
Read (1995) observes that "the argument is itself a heap, or sorites, of steps of modus ponens":

 grains is a heap.
If  grains is a heap then  grains is a heap.
So  grains is a heap.
If  grains is a heap then  grains is a heap.
So  grains is a heap.
If ...
... So  grain is a heap.

Variations

Another formulation is to start with a grain of sand, which is clearly not a heap, and then assume that adding a single grain of sand to something that is not a heap does not cause it to become a heap. Inductively, this process can be repeated as much as one wants without ever constructing a heap. A more natural formulation of this variant is to assume a set of colored chips exists such that two adjacent chips vary in color too little for human eyesight to be able to distinguish between them. Then by induction on this premise, humans would not be able to distinguish between any colors.

The removal of one drop from the ocean, will not make it 'not an ocean' (it is still an ocean), but since the volume of water in the ocean is finite, eventually, after enough removals, even a litre of water left is still an ocean.

This paradox can be reconstructed for a variety of predicates, for example, with "tall", "rich", "old", "blue", "bald", and so on. Bertrand Russell argued that all of natural language, even logical connectives, is vague; moreover, representations of propositions are vague.

Continuum fallacy
The continuum fallacy (also known as the fallacy of the beard, line-drawing fallacy, or decision-point fallacy) is an informal fallacy related to the sorites paradox. Both fallacies cause one to erroneously reject a vague claim simply because it is not as precise as one would like it to be. Vagueness alone does not necessarily imply invalidity. The fallacy is the argument that two states or conditions cannot be considered distinct (or do not exist at all) because between them there exists a continuum of states.

Strictly, the sorites paradox refers to situations where there are many discrete states (classically between 1 and 1,000,000 grains of sand, hence 1,000,000 possible states), while the continuum fallacy refers to situations where there is (or appears to be) a continuum of states, such as temperature. Whether any continua exist in the physical world is the classic question of atomism, and while both Newtonian physics and quantum physics model the world as continuous, there are some proposals in quantum gravity, such as loop quantum gravity, that suggest that notions of continuous length do not apply at the Planck length, and thus what appear to be continua may simply be as-yet undistinguishable discrete states.

For the purpose of the continuum fallacy, one assumes that there is in fact a continuum, though this is generally a minor distinction: in general, any argument against the sorites paradox can also be used against the continuum fallacy. One argument against the fallacy is based on the simple counterexample: there do exist bald people and people who are not bald. Another argument is that for each degree of change in states, the degree of the condition changes slightly, and these slight changes build up to shift the state from one category to another. For example, perhaps the addition of a grain of rice causes the total group of rice to be "slightly more" of a heap, and enough slight changes will certify the group's heap status – see fuzzy logic.

Proposed resolutions

Denying the existence of heaps
One may object to the first premise by denying that  grains of sand makes a heap. But  is just an arbitrary large number, and the argument will apply with any such number. So the response must deny outright that there are such things as heaps. Peter Unger defends this solution.

Setting a fixed boundary
A common first response to the paradox is to term any set of grains that has more than a certain number of grains in it a heap.

Collins argues that such solutions are unsatisfactory as there seems little significance to the difference between  grains and  grains. The boundary, wherever it may be set, remains arbitrary, and so its precision is misleading. It is objectionable on both philosophical and linguistic grounds: the former on account of its arbitrariness and the latter on the ground that it is simply not how natural language is used.

Unknowable boundaries (or epistemicism)
Timothy Williamson and Roy Sorensen claim that there are fixed boundaries but that they are necessarily unknowable.

Supervaluationism

Supervaluationism is a method for dealing with irreferential singular terms and vagueness. It allows one to retain the usual tautological laws even when dealing with undefined truth values.
As an example of a proposition about an irreferential singular term, consider the sentence "Pegasus likes licorice".
Since the name "Pegasus" fails to refer, no truth value can be assigned to the sentence; there is nothing in the myth that would justify any such assignment. However, there are some statements about "Pegasus" which have definite truth values nevertheless, such as "Pegasus likes licorice or Pegasus doesn't like licorice". This sentence is an instance of the tautology "", i.e. the valid schema " or not-". According to supervaluationism, it should be true regardless of whether or not its components have a truth value.

By admitting sentences without defined truth values, supervaluationism avoids adjacent cases such that n grains of sand is a heap of sand, but n-1 grains is not;
for example, " grains of sand is a heap" may be considered a border case having no defined truth value. Nevertheless, supervaluationism is able to handle a sentence like " grains of sand is a heap, or  grains of sand is not a heap" as a tautology, i.e. to assign it the value true.

Mathematical explanation
Then for every sentence , at most  distinct classical valuations can exist. A supervaluation  is a function from sentences to truth values such that, a sentence  is super-true (i.e. ) if and only if  for every classical valuation ; likewise for super-false.

For example, let  be the formal translation of "Pegasus likes licorice". So  is neither super-true nor super-false. Similarly, the formalization of the above heap proposition  is neither super-true nor super-false, but  is super-true.

Truth gaps, gluts, and multi-valued logics
Another method is to use a multi-valued logic. In this context, the problem is with the principle of bivalence: the sand is either a heap or is not a heap, without any shades of gray. Instead of two logical states, heap and not-heap, a three value system can be used, for example heap, indeterminate and not-heap. A response to this proposed solution is that three valued systems do not truly resolve the paradox as there is still a dividing line between heap and indeterminate and also between indeterminate and not-heap. The third truth-value can be understood either as a truth-value gap or as a truth-value glut.

Alternatively, fuzzy logic offers a continuous spectrum of logical states represented in the unit interval of real numbers [0,1]—it is a many-valued logic with infinitely-many truth-values, and thus the sand transitions gradually from "definitely heap" to "definitely not heap", with shades in the intermediate region. Fuzzy hedges are used to divide the continuum into regions corresponding to classes like definitely heap, mostly heap, partly heap, slightly heap, and not heap. Though the problem remains of where these borders occur; e.g. at what number of grains sand starts being 'definitely' a heap.

Hysteresis
Another method, introduced by Raffman, is to use hysteresis, that is, knowledge of what the collection of sand started as. Equivalent amounts of sand may be termed heaps or not based on how they got there. If a large heap (indisputably described as a heap) is  diminished slowly, it preserves its "heap status" to a point, even as the actual amount of sand is reduced to a smaller number of grains. For example,  grains is a pile and  grains is a heap. There will be an overlap for these states. So if one is reducing it from a heap to a pile, it is a heap going down until . At that point, one would stop calling it a heap and start calling it a pile. But if one replaces one grain, it would not instantly turn back into a heap. When going up it would remain a pile until  grains. The numbers picked are arbitrary; the point is, that the same amount can be either a heap or a pile depending on what it was before the change. A common use of hysteresis would be the thermostat for air conditioning: the AC is set at 77 °F and it then cools the air to just below 77 °F, but does not activate again instantly when the air warms to 77.001 °F—it waits until almost 78 °F, to prevent instant change of state over and over again.

Group consensus
One can establish the meaning of the word "heap" by appealing to consensus. Williamson, in his epistemic solution to the paradox, assumes that the meaning of vague terms must be determined by group usage. The consensus method typically claims that a collection of grains is as much a "heap" as the proportion of people in a group who believe it to be so. In other words, the probability that any collection is considered a heap is the expected value of the distribution of the group's opinion.

A group may decide that:
One grain of sand on its own is not a heap.
A large collection of grains of sand is a heap.

Between the two extremes, individual members of the group may disagree with each other over whether any particular collection can be labelled a "heap". The collection can then not be definitively claimed to be a "heap" or "not a heap". This can be considered an appeal to descriptive linguistics rather than prescriptive linguistics, as it resolves the issue of definition based on how the population uses natural language. Indeed, if a precise prescriptive definition of "heap" is available then the group consensus will always be unanimous and the paradox does not occur.

Resolutions in utility theory

In the economics field of utility theory, the sorites paradox arises when a person's preferences patterns are investigated.
As an example by Robert Duncan Luce, it is easy to find a person, say Peggy, who prefers in her coffee 3 grams (that is, 1 cube) of sugar to 15 grams (5 cubes), however, she will usually be indifferent between 3.00 and 3.03 grams, as well as between 3.03 and 3.06 grams, and so on, as well as finally between 14.97 and 15.00 grams.

Two measures were taken by economists to avoid the sorites paradox in such a setting.

 Comparative, rather than positive, forms of properties are used. The above example deliberately does not make a statement like "Peggy likes a cup of coffee with 3 grams of sugar", or "Peggy does not like a cup of coffee with 15 grams of sugar". Instead, it states "Peggy likes a cup of coffee with 3 grams of sugar more than one with 15 grams of sugar".
 Economists distinguish preference ("Peggy likes ... more than ...") from indifference ("Peggy likes ... as much as ... "), and do not consider the latter relation to be transitive.

Several kinds of relations were introduced to describe preference and indifference without running into the sorites paradox.
Luce defined semi-orders and investigated their mathematical properties; 
Amartya Sen performed a similar task for quasitransitive relations.
Conversely, from a given semi-order > the indifference relation ≈ can be reconstructed by defining  if neither  nor 
Similarly, from a given quasitransitive relation ≥ the indifference relation ≈ can be reconstructed by defining  if both  and 
These reconstructed ≈ relations are usually not transitive.

The table to the right shows how the above color example can be modelled as a quasi-transitive relation ≥. Color differences overdone for readability. A color X is said to be more or equally red than a color Y if the table cell in row X and column Y is not empty. In that case, if it holds a "≈", then X and Y look indistinguishably equal, and if it holds a ">", then X looks clearly more red than Y. The relation ≥ is the disjoint union of the symmetric relation ≈ and the transitive relation >. Using the transitivity of >, the knowledge of both  >  and  >  allows one to infer that  > . However, since ≥ is not transitive, a "paradoxical" inference like " ≥  and  ≥ , hence   ≥ " is no longer possible. For the same reason, e.g. " ≈  and  ≈ , hence   ≈ " is no longer a valid inference. Similarly, to resolve the original heap variation of the paradox with this approach, the relation "X grains are more a heap than Y grains" could be considered quasitransitive rather than transitive.

Geometrical shape definition
The concept of a heap can be defined as a geometric shape in space, such as a pyramid, composed of randomly arranged sand particles. The existence of a heap can be said to cease when there are no longer sufficient sand particles to maintain the defined geometric shape. This philosophical resolution influenced by mathematical principles was proposed by Alex Dragomir, a Romanian philosopher, in 2023.

See also

 Ambiguity
 Boiling frog
 Closed concept
 Fuzzy concept
 I know it when I see it
 Imprecise language
 List of fallacies
 Loki's Wager
 Ring species
 Ship of Theseus
 Slippery slope
 Straw that broke the camel's back

References

Bibliography

; Sect.3

External links

 by Dominic Hyde.
 Sandra LaFave: Open and Closed Concepts and the Continuum Fallacy

Logical paradoxes
Semantics
Ambiguity